Michael or Mike Clarke may refer to:

 J. Michael Clarke, British acoustic and electroacoustic musician
 Michael Clarke (skier) (born 1970), Australia's first world champion in a winter sport
 Michael Clarke (academic), British academic who specialises in defence studies
 Michael Clarke (Australian politician) (1915–2002), member of the Victorian Legislative Council
 Michael Clarke (Barbadian cricketer) (1913–1982)
 Michael Clarke (Canadian politician), a Progressive Conservative Party of Canada candidate
 Michael Clarke (cricketer) (born 1981), former captain of the Australian national cricket team
 Michael Clarke (musician) (1946–1993), American musician
 Michael Clarke (ornithologist), Australian ornithologist
 Michael Clarke (priest) (1935–1978), Anglican provost
 Michael Clarke Duncan (1957–2012), American actor
 Mike Clarke (ice hockey, born 1953), Canadian ice hockey player
 Michael Clarke (jockey), Australian jockey
 Michael E. Clarke, Australian political scientist 
 Mick Clarke, British guitarist, member of Killing Floor

See also 
 Michael Clark (disambiguation)